The  was an electric multiple unit (EMU) train type for local services on the Chichibu Main Line operated by the Chichibu Railway in Japan between 1962 and 1992.

Formation
The trains were formed as follows.
 DeHa 500 + KuHa 600

Interior
While based on the earlier 300 series express design, these sets had longitudinal seating. The KuHa 600 cars were originally fitted with a toilet, but these were later removed.

History
Nine 2-car trains were built in 1962. The trains were replaced by 2000 series EMUs from 1991 and withdrawn by 1992.

References

Electric multiple units of Japan
Train-related introductions in 1962
Chichibu Railway
1500 V DC multiple units of Japan